The RZA Hits is a compilation produced by The RZA. It contains songs featured on the first Wu-Tang Clan album and its first round of solo albums. All songs, apart from "Brooklyn Zoo", are produced by RZA.

Reception
Entertainment Weekly (Spring 2000, p. 166) - Ranked #9 in EW's "Top 10 albums of the '90s"
Q magazine (8/99, p. 134) - 4 stars (out of 5) - "...a supremely populist selection...keeping the molten hit count high. If the consistency of these prime-time cuts was sustained, this would probably be the best rap compilation ever rather than merely one of the best."
Muzik (8/99, p. 79) - 5 stars (out of 5) - "...singular brilliance....Greatest Hits is as effective an insight into [RZA's] unique Staten Island mayhem as the title suggests."
Rap Pages (9/99, p. 182) - "...the perfect reference manual for [RZA's] importance to rap music....a must-listen for anyone who has ever uttered the word 'Hip-Hop'." - Rating: A

Track listing

Samples used
"Wu-Tang Clan Ain't Nuthing Ta F' Wit" contains samples of "Impeach The President" by The Honey Drippers and "Hihache" by Lafayette Afro Rock Band.
"Shimmy Shimmy Ya" contains samples of "Hip-Hug-Her" by Booker T. & the MG's, "I Like It" by The Emotions, "Knocks Me Off My Feet" by Stevie Wonder and "Have Your Ass Home by 11:00" by Richard Pryor.
"Liquid Swords" contains samples of "Groovin'" and "Mercy, Mercy, Mercy" by Willie Mitchell and "That's the Way It Is" by Al Green.
"Method Man" contains samples of "Sport" by Lightnin Rod, "Synthetic Substitution" by Melvin Bliss and "More Bounce To The Ounce" by Zapp. Also contains interpolations of "I'm Just A Bill," originally performed by Schoolhouse Rock, and "Method of Modern Love", originally performed by Hall & Oates.
"Incarcerated Scarfaces" contains samples of "Wang Dang Doodle" by Koko Taylor and "You're Gettin' a Little Too Smart" by The Detroit Emeralds.
"Bring the Pain" contains a sample of "Mechanical Man" by Jerry Butler.
"Winter Warz" contains a sample of "I Think I'd Do It" by Z. Z. Hill.
"All I Need" contains a sample of "Synthetic Substitution" by Melvin Bliss, and an interpolation of "You're All I Need To Get By," originally performed by Marvin Gaye.
"C.R.E.A.M." contains a sample of "As Long As I've Got You" by The Charmells.
"All That I Got Is You" contains a sample of "Maybe Tomorrow" by The Jackson 5.
"Wu Wear The Garment Renaissance" contains a sample of "Don't Take My Kindness for Weakness" by The Soul Children.

Album chart positions

Credits

Wu-Tang Clan
 Inspectah Deck – vocals, lyrics
 Ghostface Killah – executive producer, vocals, lyrics
 GZA/Genius – vocals, lyrics
 Masta Killa – vocals, lyrics
 Method Man – vocals, producer, lyrics
 Ol' Dirty Bastard – vocals, producer, lyrics
 RZA/Prince Rakeem – arranger, executive producer, mixing, producer, programming, vocals, lyrics
 Raekwon – vocals, lyrics
 U-God – vocals, lyrics

Additional personnel
 4th Disciple – scratching

References 

RZA albums
1999 compilation albums
Epic Records compilation albums
Albums produced by RZA